Thioalkalivibrio versutus is an obligately alkaliphilic and obligately chemolithoautotrophic sulfur-oxidizing bacteria. It was first isolated from soda lakes in northern Russia.

References

Further reading

External links
LPSN

Type strain of Thioalkalivibrio versutus at BacDive -  the Bacterial Diversity Metadatabase

Chromatiales